Presidential elections were held in Kenya on 26 October 2017 following the Supreme Court's annulment of the results of the presidential vote in the August 2017 general elections. The election was won by incumbent president Uhuru Kenyatta of the Jubilee Party, who won 98.3% of the popular vote to defeat Raila Odinga of the Orange Democratic Movement (ODM).

Background

General elections were held in Kenya on 8 August 2017. Incumbent President Uhuru Kenyatta was declared the winner of the presidential contest with 54.17% of the vote, whilst his main rival Raila Odinga finished second with 44.94% of the vote. The opposition claimed that it had won and that the government had rigged the elections. The opposition appealed to the Supreme Court. Citing a breach of the technical processes required by the constitution and the law, the court returned a verdict (by a margin of 4–2) that the election had not been "conducted in accordance with the constitution", cancelling the results and ordering fresh elections to be held within 60 days. In a television address Kenyatta complained that the decision was tantamount to overturning the "will of the people". He nevertheless stated that though he disagreed with the Supreme Court's decision, he would obey that decision. Raila Odinga on the other hand welcomed the court's verdict, saying "This indeed is a very historic day for the people of Kenya and by extension the people of the continent of Africa."

Electoral system
The President of Kenya is elected using a modified version of the two-round system: to win in the first round, a candidate must receive over 50% of the vote nationally and 25% of the vote in at least 24 of Kenya's 47 counties.

Candidates

In early October, Odinga announced that he was withdrawing from the election. Following his withdrawal from the presidential race, there was heated debate among lawyers as to the legality of IEBC continuing with the elections. Proponents of the elections argued that the court ruled a repeat election to be conducted within 60 days and this must happen no matter what the main opposition decides to do. Additionally, they argued that it was not possible to reform the IEBC as he was demanding due to constitutional limitations. Moreover, pulling out of the race required him to fill out a form 22a, which he refused to do, saying that it was an unnecessary formality. This means that he intentionally wanted to remain ambiguous and hence had not officially withdrawn. As such, his name would be in the ballot papers. 

On the opposite end, opponents of the elections argued that the cancellation of one nominee means that there can no longer be an election as provided for in the Kenyan constitution following the 2013 Supreme Court ruling that such an event necessitated the cancellation of an election. Additionally, they argue that as this is not a fresh election but a repeat election, there is no need for any candidate to withdraw to do so by filling any form. This means that Raila's withdrawal through a letter was enough to prove that he is out of the race. Earlier, the Third Way Alliance presidential candidate Ekuru Aukot had appealed against the IEBC decision to exclude him from the vote citing a breach of the law. As it turned out, the court of appeal ruled that the IEBC decision to exclude the candidate had no basis in law since the October 26 election was a fresh election. The court also ruled that all presidential candidates in the October 26 election were free to contest as presidential candidates in October 26, 2017. 

On 18 October, recently resigned IEBC Commissioner Roselyn Akombe issued a statement declaring that the second presidential election wouldn't be a fair election. Akombe also fled to the United States of America out of fear for her life.

On 18 October, IEBC Chairman Wafula Chebukati expressed skepticism about a fair election as well, claiming the IEBC commissioners were partisan-minded and that he would resign unless certain conditions are met to reform the IEBC.

On 20 October, the IEBC's chief executive officer Ezra Chiloba announced that he will not be monitoring the election and that starting 23 October, he will take a three-week vacation. Chiloba's departure has created more uncertainty over who will monitor the election.

On 24 October, the IEBC announced that it would now count back-up paper ballots and not rush to announce the official results based only on numbers sent from the polling stations like in the first presidential election as well.  The same day, Chebukati appointed IEBC Vice Chair Consolata N.B. Maina as the IEBC Deputy National Returning Officer.

Results
On 30 October the IEBC declared Kenyatta the winner of the elections.

Aftermath

Supreme Court decision
Two petitions were filed at Kenyan Supreme Court challenging the results of the 26 October 2017 election. The six judge bench unanimously decided that the petitions had no merit and upheld Uhuru Kenyatta's win for a second term.

Inauguration
As per the constitutional timelines Kenyatta's second inauguration was conducted on 28 November 2017.

References

Kenya
Presidential
Kenya
2017 10